Miss International 1985, the 25th Miss International pageant, was held on 15 September 1985 at Tsukuba's Expo Plaza. The pageant was hosted by Masumi Okada. this was the first time that Venezuela won the title of Miss International.

Results

Placements

Contestants

  - Ketrina Ray Keeley
  - Martina Margarete Haiden
  - Mireille Paula Baele
  - Ana Patricia Castellanos
  - Kátia Nascimento Guimarães
  - Jennifer Frances Bruno
  - Maria Pia Duque Rengifo
  - Marianela Herrera Marín
  - Susan Boje Rasmussen
  - Andrea Vivienne Boardman
  - Marjukka Helena Tontti
  - Nathalie Jones
  - Stefanie Angelika Roth
  - Efthimia Dereca
  - Teresa Artero Kasperbauer
  - Perla Lissette Prera Fruhwirth
  - Jacqueline Schumitch
  - Waleska Zavala
  - Ellen Wong Ai-Lane
  - Anna Margret Jonsdóttir
  - Vinita Seshadri Vasan
  - Karen Ann Shevlin
  - Avivit Nachmany
  - Gabriela Ongaro
  - Makiko Matsumoto
  - Chang Sih-wha
  - Rebecca de Alba Díaz
  - Paula Louise Franich
  - Antoinette Marie Flores
  - Torunn Forsberg
  - Diana Marina Lau
  - Sabrina Simonette Marie Roig Artadi
  - Katarzyna Dorota Zawidzka
  - Ana Paula Machado Charepe
  - Karen Helen Bell
  - Chwee Lan Chua
  - Beatriz Molero Beltrán
  - Lucienne Thiebaud
  - Sasimaporn Chaikomol †
  - Sarie Nerine Jourbert
  - Alejandrina "Nina" Sicilia Hernández
  - Samantha Amystone
  - Tumba Mulamba

1985
1985 in Japan
1985 beauty pageants
Beauty pageants in Japan